See My Lawyer is a 1945 American comedy film directed by Edward F. Cline and written by Edmund Hartmann and Stanley Davis. It is based on the 1939 musical See My Lawyer by Richard Maibaum and Harry Clork. The film stars Ole Olsen, Chic Johnson, Alan Curtis, Grace McDonald, Noah Beery Jr., Franklin Pangborn and Edward Brophy. The film was released on March 9, 1945, by Universal Pictures.

Plot

The entertainers, "Ole & Chic", have received better offers elsewhere, and are eager to break their contract at Wagonhorn's nightclub. Wagonhorn is just as eager to keep them on at the low salary he signed them for. However, when the team takes drastic measures one night, destroying the club and subjecting the patrons to slapstick abuse, Wagonhorn is so frightened by this display he sells the club to the two of them just to get away from them. Although an insulted patron (Ed Brophy) files a damage suit against "Ole & Chic", they not only win the suit, but the beginning law firm they hire to defend them ends up prospering from the publicity.

Cast        
Ole Olsen as Ole
Chic Johnson as Chic
Alan Curtis as Charlie Rodman
Grace McDonald as Betty Wilson
Noah Beery Jr. as Arthur Lane
Franklin Pangborn as B.J. Wagonhorn
Edward Brophy as Otis Fillmore 
Richard Benedict as Joe Wilson
Lee Patrick as Sally Evans
Gus Schilling as J. Ambrose Winkler aka Winky
William B. Davidson as Judge
Stanley Clements as Willie
Mary Gordon as Mrs. Fillmore
Ralph Peters as O'Brien
Carmen Amaya as herself
Yvette (Elsa Harris Silver) as Specialty Singer
Nat King Cole as himself (in The King Cole Trio)
Vernon Dent as Nightclub Patron

References

External links
 

1945 films
American comedy films
1945 comedy films
Universal Pictures films
Films directed by Edward F. Cline
American black-and-white films
Films with screenplays by Richard Maibaum
Films based on musicals
1940s English-language films
1940s American films